The 1986 Arizona State Sun Devils football team represented Arizona State University during the 1986 NCAA Division I-A football season.

Season summary
Arizona State quarterback Jeff Van Raaphorst looked uncomfortable in the first two games of the season, wins over Michigan State and SMU. He threw five interceptions in the third game of year against Washington State, which ended in a 21–21 tie.  A 16–9 win for Arizona State over UCLA in Pasadena on October 4 later proved to be the deciding game in the race for the Pac-10 Conference title. The Sun Devils then defeated Oregon in Eugene and returned to Southern California to defeat USC at the Los Angeles Memorial Coliseum, becoming the first Pac-10 team to beat both Los Angeles area conference members on their home turf.

With three straight wins at home over former WAC nemesis, Utah, Washington, and Cal, combined with a UCLA loss to Stanford, Arizona State clinched the Pac-10 title and a Rose Bowl berth on November 8.  The Sun Devils dropped their final game of the regular season to in-state rival Arizona, 34–17, in the annual battle for the Territorial Cup.
The Sun Devils then defeated Michigan 22–15 on January 1, 1987, for their first Rose Bowl Game.

Schedule

Personnel

Rankings

Game summaries

at Arizona

vs. Michigan (Rose Bowl)

References

Arizona State
Arizona State Sun Devils football seasons
Pac-12 Conference football champion seasons
Rose Bowl champion seasons
Arizona State Sun Devils football